Alan Charles Jardine (born September 3, 1942) is an American musician, singer, and songwriter who co-founded the Beach Boys. He is best known as the band's rhythm guitarist and for occasionally singing lead vocals on singles such as "Help Me, Rhonda" (1965), "Then I Kissed Her" (1965), "Cotton Fields" (1970), and "Come Go with Me" (1978). His song "Lady Lynda" was also a UK top 10 hit for the group in 1978. Other Beach Boys songs that feature Jardine on lead include "I Know There's an Answer" (1966), "Vegetables" (1967), and "From There to Back Again" (2012).

Following the death of fellow band member Carl Wilson in 1998, Jardine left the touring Beach Boys and has since performed as a solo artist, rejoining the band only for their 2012 50th anniversary tour. Since 2013, Jardine has toured as part of Beach Boys founder Brian Wilson’s band. He has released one solo studio album, A Postcard from California (2010). Jardine was inducted into the Rock and Roll Hall of Fame as a member of the Beach Boys in 1988.

Early life
Alan Charles Jardine was born at Lima Memorial Hospital in Lima, Ohio, the younger of two children to Virginia and Donald Jardine. Having spent his first years of childhood in Lima, he moved with his family to Rochester, New York, where his father worked for Eastman Kodak and taught at the Rochester Institute of Technology. His family later moved to San Francisco and then to Hawthorne, California, where he and his older brother Neal spent the remainder of their youth.

At Hawthorne High School, he was a fullback on the football team, soon befriending backup quarterback Brian Wilson. Jardine also watched Brian and brother Carl Wilson singing at a school assembly. After attending Ferris State University during the 1960–61 academic year, Jardine registered as a student at El Camino College in 1961. There, he was reunited with Brian and first presented the idea of forming a band as the two worked through harmony ideas together in the college's music room. Jardine's primary musical interest was folk and he learned banjo and guitar specifically to play folk music. When the Beach Boys formed at Wilson's home, he first tried to push the band toward folk but was overruled in favor of rock 'n' roll.

A versatile string instrumentalist, Jardine played stand-up bass on the Beach Boys' first recording, the song "Surfin'" (1961). He fully rejoined the Beach Boys in the summer of 1963 at Brian Wilson's request and worked alongside guitarist David Marks with the band until October 1963, when Marks quit the Beach Boys after an altercation with the band's manager, Murry Wilson.

Career

1960s–80s

Jardine played double bass on the Beach Boys' first (and only) record for Candix Records, "Surfin'", but quit the band a few months later, in February 1962. A common misconception is that Jardine left to focus on dental school. In reality, Jardine did not even apply to dental school until 1964, and the reason he left was due to creative differences and his belief that the newly-formed group would not be a commercial success. He returned to the Beach Boys full-time in 1963 following David Marks' departure.

Jardine first sang lead on "Christmas Day", on 1964's The Beach Boys' Christmas Album and followed with the Number 1 hit "Help Me, Rhonda". It was at Jardine's suggestion that the Beach Boys recorded a version of the folk standard "Sloop John B", which Brian Wilson arranged and produced for their Pet Sounds album in 1966.

After Brian Wilson discontinued touring in late 1964, Jardine took on a more prominent role as a lead vocalist during live performances with the group. Beginning with his contributions to the Friends album, Jardine also became a songwriter and wrote or co-wrote a number of songs for the Beach Boys. "California Saga: California" from the Holland album, charted in early 1973. Jardine's song for his first wife, "Lady Lynda" (1978), scored a Top Ten chart entry in the UK. Increasingly from the time of the Surf's Up album, Al became involved alongside Carl Wilson in production duties for the Beach Boys. He shared production credits with Ron Altbach on M.I.U. Album (1978) and was a significant architect (with Mike Love) of the album's concept and content. As with "Lady Lynda" and his 1969 rewrite of Lead Belly's "Cotton Fields," "Come Go with Me" and "Peggy Sue" on M.I.U. Album were Jardine productions, the first being a measurable hit in the UK.

Jardine instigated the Beach Boys' recording of a remake of the Mamas and the Papas' song "California Dreamin'" (featuring Roger McGuinn), reaching No. 8 on the Billboard adult contemporary chart in 1986. The associated music video featured in heavy rotation on MTV and secured extensive international airplay. The video featured all the surviving Beach Boys and two of the three surviving members of the Mamas and the Papas, John Phillips and Michelle Phillips (Denny Doherty was on the East coast and declined), along with former Byrds guitarist Roger McGuinn.

1990s–present

Following Carl Wilson's death in 1998, Jardine was forced out of the touring version of the Beach Boys, leaving Love as the only original member in the group playing live concerts. Jardine continued to tour and recorded with his Endless Summer Band, in a line-up that utilized many longtime Beach Boys touring members, including Billy Hinsche of Dino, Desi and Billy; Ed Carter; Bobby Figueroa; and Jardine's sons, Matt and Adam. In 2002, Jardine's band released Live in Las Vegas. Jardine toured under the banners "Beach Boys Family & Friends", "Al Jardine, Beach Boy" and "Al Jardine of the Beach Boys" during this time. Former bandmate Mike Love decided to sue him in order to prevent the use of the Beach Boys name, which he had licensed in 1999. The courts ruled in Love's favor, denying Jardine the use of the Beach Boys name in any fashion. Jardine proceeded to appeal this decision in addition to seeking $4 million in damages. The California Court of Appeal ruled that Love acted wrongfully in freezing Jardine out of touring under the Beach Boys name, allowing Jardine to continue with his lawsuit. The case ended up being settled outside of court with the terms not disclosed  In late 2006, Jardine joined Brian Wilson and his band for a short tour celebrating the 40th anniversary of Pet Sounds.

In March 2008, Jardine settled a lawsuit brought against him by Love and the estate of Carl Wilson regarding use of the "Beach Boys" name. Love had leased the Beach Boys name, and it was deemed that Jardine's newly formed band, called the Beach Boys Family & Friends (featuring sons Matt and Adam Jardine, Carnie and Wendy Wilson, Daryl Dragon, Billy Hinsche and others), was a breach of title use.

In 2009, Jardine's lead vocal on "Big Sur Christmas" was released on MP3 download, produced by longtime Red Barn Studios engineer Stevie Heger under Heger's band's name, Hey Stevie. The track also was released on the Hey Stevie album, Eloquence.

Jardine released A Postcard from California, his solo debut, in June 2010 (re-released with two extra tracks on April 3, 2012). The album features contributions from Beach Boys Brian Wilson, Carl Wilson (a posthumous track), Bruce Johnston, David Marks and Mike Love. There are also guest appearances from Glen Campbell, David Crosby, Neil Young, Stephen Stills, Steve Miller, Scott Mathews, Gerry Beckley and Dewey Bunnell (members of America) and Flea. A spoken intermission written by Stephen Kalinich, called "Tidepool Interlude", features actor Alec Baldwin.

Jardine made his first appearance with the Beach Boys touring band in more than 10 years in 2011 at a tribute concert for Ronald Reagan's 100th birthday, where he sang "Help Me, Rhonda" and "Sloop John B". He made a handful of other appearances with the touring band in preparation for a reunion

In December 2011, it was announced that Brian Wilson, Mike Love, Al Jardine, Bruce Johnston and David Marks would reunite for a new Beach Boys album and The Beach Boys 50th Anniversary Reunion Tour in 2012.  The album, titled That's Why God Made the Radio, was released in June 2012 and features the song "From There to Back Again" with Jardine in the lead vocals with Wilson. Critics have acclaimed Jardine's performance in the song, with Ryan Reed of Paste magazine praising his "stand-out lead vocal", while John Bush of Allmusic deemed the song the "most beautiful" in the album, having been "impeccably" framed by Wilson around Jardine's "aging but still sweet" voice.

In September 2012, it was announced that Jardine, Wilson and Marks would no longer tour with the band. Love returned the lineup to its pre-Anniversary Tour configuration, with Love as the only original member (Bruce Johnston joined in 1965). As a result, it was announced that Jardine would appear with Marks and Wilson, along with Wilson's band, for a short summer tour in 2013, featuring the three.

Continuing in collaboration with Wilson, Jardine and Marks contributed to Wilson's solo album, No Pier Pressure, which was released in April 2015.  Jardine also contributed to Wilson's Pet Sounds 50th Anniversary World Tour and has been featured in all subsequent tours. In July 2016, Jardine appeared in an episode of the Adult Swim series Decker, playing the role of the President's "science advisor".

Jardine and his son, Matt, contributed backing vocals to John Mayer's "Emoji of a Wave", which was released in 2017. In 2018, Jardine began performing solo storyteller concerts called "Al Jardine – A Postcard From California - From the Very First Song With a Founding Member of the Beach Boys" which featured his son Matt and long time Peter Asher associate Jeff Alan Ross. Jardine continued to tour these shows into 2020, while still performing with the Brian Wilson band.

In April 2019, Jardine was inducted into the Rochester Music Hall of Fame.

On February 12, 2021, Jardine released a two-song CD single featuring a new rendition of his bonus track from "A Postcard from California" titled "Waves of Love 2.0" and a new song "Jenny Clover". It was co-written and produced by his long time collaborating partner Larry Dvoskin. A portion of the proceeds were earmarked to raise money for "The World Central Kitchen" charity org.

In 2022, Jardine announced the "Family & Friends Tour" featuring Carnie & Wendy Wilson of Wilson Phillips. “Family & Friends” will also feature Al’s son, Matt Jardine, the eight-member band for the tour will be led by Rob Bonfiglio, who is Wilson Phillips’ musical director and performs regularly in Brian Wilson’s band. The band will also include long time Beach Boys associates Ed Carter, Bobby Figueroa and Probyn Gregory.

Book
Jardine has authored one book, Sloop John B: A Pirate's Tale (2005), illustrated by Jimmy Pickering. The book is a children's story about a boy's Caribbean adventure with his grandfather, reworded from the original folk lyric of the song "Sloop John B". It also includes a free CD with singalong acoustic recording by Jardine.

Discography

Albums

Singles

 Songs (written or co-written)

 Surfer Girl (1963)
 "South Bay Surfer (The Old Folks at Home)"
 All Summer Long (1964)
 "Our Favorite Recording Sessions"
 Wild Honey (1967)
 "How She Boogalooed It"
 Friends (1968)
 "Friends"
 "Wake the World"
 "Be Here in the Mornin'"
 "When a Man Needs a Woman"
 "Transcendental Meditation"
 Sunflower (1970)
 "It's About Time"
 "Our Sweet Love"
 "At My Window"
 Surf's Up (1971)
 "Don't Go Near the Water"
 "Take a Load Off Your Feet"
 "Lookin' at Tomorrow (A Welfare Song)"
 Carl and the Passions – "So Tough" (1972)
 "He Come Down"
 "All This Is That"
 Holland (1973)
 "California Saga: The Beaks of Eagles"
 "California Saga: California"
 15 Big Ones (1976)
 "Susie Cincinnati"
 The Beach Boys Love You (1977)
 "Good Time"
 M.I.U. Album (1978)
 "Kona Coast"
 "Pitter Patter"
 L.A. (Light Album) (1979)
 "Lady Lynda"
 Keepin' the Summer Alive (1980)
 "Santa Ana Winds"
 The Beach Boys (1985)
 "Crack at Your Love"
 "California Calling"
 Still Cruisin' (1989)
 "Island Girl (I'm Gonna Make Her Mine)"

References

Bibliography

External links
Al Jardine Interview NAMM Oral History Library (1987)

1942 births
Living people
20th-century American guitarists
21st-century American guitarists
American male bass guitarists
American male guitarists
American male singer-songwriters
American rock bass guitarists
American rock guitarists
American rock singers
American rock songwriters
The Beach Boys members
El Camino College alumni
Guitarists from California
Guitarists from Ohio
Musicians from Hawthorne, California
People from Lima, Ohio
Record producers from California
Rhythm guitarists
Singer-songwriters from Ohio
Singer-songwriters from California